Ismail Keta (born 1 December 1976 in Bulqizë) is an Albanian kickboxer who was a three time German champion  in 1999 and 2000 in Federation WKA. In 2001 he was proclaimed world champion Under Thaibox ( WKA ). In November  19-11-2011 he won the title of Federation World Champion Iska . In 2012 he won World Champion title again. His last title came in December 7-12-2013 for federation IKBF.

Early life
Jonny climbed every morning on a rope to the roof of his parents' house condition himself. He began his career as an amateur boxer.

Politicians and business people hired him as a bodyguard. At 19  he left Albania to refine his combative skills. Keta began his career as a K-1 (Top league in Thai kickboxing)  fighter on 14/06/2003 in Bergheim. On 23/05/2004 he fought in Gelsenkirchen at the Heavyweight Explosion. He was victorious in two battles, even by task in the third round and won the finals by points. Although in the last battle he was felled by an unauthorized low blow (knee), he recovered and won by unanimous decision. He was supervised by the federal trainer Detlef Thürnau and his medical supervisor and friend Dr. Michael Weh. Jonny won the overall title of the tournament.

"The Bull" in Germany
In 1997, Ismail Keta "The Bull" moved to Würzburg where he started as an amateur boxer with moderate success. He joined trainer Victor Koehl, of Dragon Gym, where he received technical touches, especially in Mixed Martial ArtsTandhai and kickboxing. Later he worked with coach Detlef Thürnau (the President of the K-1 committee, MTBD (Muay Thai Federation Germany), Klaus Nonnenmacher (7-time world champion in kickboxing), and WKA (World Kickboxing Association) and Klaus Begala ( Grandmaster in Jiu-Jiutsu Freefight).

Professional kickboxing record
His career spanned fourteen years. His record included:
1999 Bavarian champion in Thai boxing (super heavyweight MTBD, Thürnau)
2000 German Champion in kick-boxing (super heavyweight WKA, Nonnenmacher)
2001 Victorious battle against reigning World Champion in Free-Fight (Super-heavyweight)
2001 vice-world champion in Thai boxing (super heavyweight WKA)
2002 professional license
2003 K-1 fighter in the super-heavyweight
2011 ISKA kickboxing champion
2012 ISKA kickboxing champion
2013 IKBF World Champion Champion

References

People from Bulqizë
1976 births
Living people
Albanian male kickboxers